A Genuine Tong Funeral is an album by vibraphonist Gary Burton featuring compositions by Carla Bley recorded in 1967 and released on the RCA label in 1968. It features Burton with Bley herself on keyboards and conducting an expanded ensemble consisting of trumpeter Michael Mantler, trombonist Jimmy Knepper, tenor saxophonist Gato Barbieri, soprano saxophonist Steve Lacy, baritone saxophonist Howard Johnson, guitarist Larry Coryell, bassist Steve Swallow and drummer Bob Moses.

Reception
The Allmusic review by Scott Yanow awarded the album 4½ stars, stating: "One of vibraphonist Gary Burton's most intriguing recordings... The music is dramatic, occasionally a little humorous, and a superb showcase for Gary Burton's vibes".

Track listing
All compositions by Carla Bley.
 "The Opening / Interlude : Shovels / The Survivors / Grave Train" - 6:37   
 "Death Rolls" - 1:36   
 "Morning (Part 1)" - 1:43   
 "Interlude : Lament / Intermission Music" - 4:28   
 "Silent Spring" - 7:58   
 "Fanfare / Mother of the Dead Man" - 2:51   
 "Some Dirge" - 7:47   
 "Morning (Part 2)" - 1:17   
 "The New Funeral March" - 2:40   
 "The New National Anthem / The Survivors" - 6:34  
Recorded in New York City in July 1967.

Personnel
 Gary Burton – vibraphone
 Michael Mantler – trumpet
 Jimmy Knepper – trombone, bass trombone
 Howard Johnson – tuba, baritone saxophone
 Steve Lacy – soprano saxophone
 Gato Barbieri – tenor saxophone
 Carla Bley – piano, organ, conductor
 Larry Coryell – guitar
 Steve Swallow – double bass
 Bob Moses – drums

References

Further reading 
 

RCA Records albums
Carla Bley albums
Gary Burton albums
1968 albums